, (born 28 October 1986, in Ueki, Kamoto District (now Kita-ku, Kumamoto), Kumamoto Prefecture better known as  is a Japanese variety tarento, actress, and singer. She was a member of musical groups Pabo and Aladdin. She is represented with K Dash Stage.

Suzanne dropped out from Daichi Economic University High School (now Daichi University Associate High School). She later re-enrolled from that school in April 2021, and graduated on March 2022.

She is currently studying at Japan University of Economics.

Discography

Singles

Videos

Filmography

TV series
Regular appearances

Quasi-regular appearances

Former appearances

Dramas

Films

Voice acting

Advertisements

Others

Music videos

Bibliography

Photobooks

References

External links
 

Japanese television personalities
Japanese gravure idols
1986 births
Living people
People from Kumamoto